The 1946 Fresno State Bulldogs football team represented Fresno State Normal School—now known as California State University, Fresno—during the 1946 college football season.

Fresno State competed in the California Collegiate Athletic Association (CCAA). The team was led by eighth-year head coach James Bradshaw and played home games at Ratcliffe Stadium on the campus of Fresno City College in Fresno, California. They finished the season with a record of eight wins and four losses (8–4, 2–2 CCAA). The Bulldogs outscored their opponents 177–129 for the season.

Schedule

Team players in the NFL
The following Fresno State Bulldog players were selected in the 1947 NFL Draft.

The following Fresno State Bulldog players finished their college career in 1946, were not drafted, but played in the NFL.

Notes

References

Fresno State
Fresno State Bulldogs football seasons
Fresno State Bulldogs football